Central Bernard McClellion (born September 15, 1975) is a former American football cornerback in the National Football League for the Washington Redskins (2001) and the Kansas City Chiefs (2002).  He played college football at Ohio State University.

1975 births
Living people
Sportspeople from Delray Beach, Florida
Players of American football from Florida
American football cornerbacks
Ohio State Buckeyes football players
Washington Redskins players
Kansas City Chiefs players
Scottish Claymores players